International Khiladi is a 1999 Indian action drama film directed by Umesh Mehra starring Akshay Kumar and Twinkle Khanna in the lead roles. In an interview with Lehren Network, Khanna said that the film didn't follow a conventional script while Kumar stated that the film had more of romance than action. Indian film trade website Box Office India gave the film a "Below Average" rating.

Plot 
News Reporter Payal (Twinkle Khanna) and her camera-man Focus (Johnny Lever) have been assigned the task of interviewing the world's highest ranking criminal don, Rahul alias Devraj (Akshay Kumar), which they accept. In the process, Payal and Devraj fall in love with each other, much to the opposition of Bismillah (Mukesh Khanna), Devraj's guardian on the one hand, and Police Inspector Amit (Rajat Bedi), and Payal's brother Ravi (Vivek Shauq) on the other. What results is that Ravi is killed, with Devraj being blamed and arrested. Payal testifies against him, and Devraj is sentenced to be hanged. When Bismillah finds about this plot, he tracks them down, but Amit kills him to save himself and Payal. But Devraj escapes from custody, and begins to plot vengeance against his enemies, including Payal, as well as the real killer of Ravi. As the story unfolds, it is revealed that Amit was the one who killed Ravi and joined Thakral (Gulshan Grover) to frame Devraj for it. But Amit betrays Thakral and kills him. He then takes Devraj on a flight where Devraj tracks him down and kills him. The story ends with Payal and Devraj getting married.

Cast 
Akshay Kumar as Devraj / Rahul
Rajat Bedi as Amit
Twinkle Khanna as Payal, Ravi's sister.
Vivek Shauq as Ravi, Payal's brother.
Gulshan Grover as Thakral
Mukesh Khanna as Bismillah, Devraj's guardian.
Johnny Lever as Focus, Payal's Cameraman.
Lester Speight as henchman of Gulshan Grover
Asrani as Payal's boss
Avtar Gill as Defence Lawyer
Shahbaaz Khan as Police Commissioner
Subbiraj as S.P. Sharma 
Ram Mohan as Prosecuting Lawyer
Vivek Vaswani as Vivek Shrivastav
Gajendra Chouhan as Rahul's father
Shagufta Ali as Rahul's mother
Omkar Kapoor as Young Rahul

Production
The film was co-produced by Canadian businessman Ajay Virmani. It was shot in Calgary and Toronto.

Soundtrack

Rediff.com noted that the film's songs "seem to be good".

References

External links
 

1990s Hindi-language films
1999 films
Films scored by Aadesh Shrivastava
Films set in Canada
Indian gangster films
1999 action thriller films
1990s romantic action films
Indian romantic action films
Indian romantic drama films
Indian action drama films
Films directed by Umesh Mehra